Konstantinos Hadziotis was a Greek chess player, Greek Chess Championship winner (1963).

Biography
In the mid-1960s Konstantinos Hadziotis was one of Greek leading chess players. In 1963 he won Greek Chess Championship.

Konstantinos Hadziotis played for Greece in the Chess Olympiads:
 In 1962, at second reserve board in the 15th Chess Olympiad in Varna (+3, =1, -4),
 In 1964, at fourth board in the 16th Chess Olympiad in Tel Aviv (+4, =4, -5).

Konstantinos Hadziotis participated in chess tournaments until the 1980s, after which there is no information about his life.

References

External links

Year of birth missing
Year of death missing
Greek chess players
Chess Olympiad competitors
20th-century Greek people